Gizi Kiuvu Diampasi (born 5 February 1988), known as Guyssie Kiuvu, is a DR Congolese footballer who plays as a defender. She has been a member of the DR Congo women's national team.

Club career
Kiuvu has played for Grand Hôtel in the Democratic Republic of the Congo.

International career
Kiuvu was capped for the DR Congo at senior level during the 2006 African Women's Championship.

See also
 List of Democratic Republic of the Congo women's international footballers

References

External links

1988 births
Living people
Democratic Republic of the Congo women's footballers
Women's association football defenders
Democratic Republic of the Congo women's international footballers
21st-century Democratic Republic of the Congo people